This article gives an overview of liberalism in Ukraine. It is limited to liberal parties with substantial support, mainly proved by having had a representation in parliament. The sign ⇒ denotes another party in that scheme. For inclusion in this scheme, it is not necessary so that parties labeled themselves as a liberal party.

The Radical Democrats were one of the dominant forces in pre-revolutionary Russian Ukraine. Due to the splintered party system in Ukraine, the timeline is limited to the post-1990 period. The position of liberalism nowadays is unclear.

History
In the mid-1990s, the Liberal Party of Ukraine (Liberalna Partia, observer LI) formed out of small parties in the Crimea. The Yulia Tymoshenko Electoral Bloc (Viborcyj Blok Julii Tymošenko) seemed to develop into a more or less liberal party. The UDAR, which as of 2013 holds 42 seats in the Verkhovna Rada, has been described as a "Western-style liberal party". Other, small liberal parties include Liberal Democratic Party of Ukraine, Reforms and Order Party, PORA and Yabluko. Also, the Democratic Party of Ukraine and the Democratic Union have sometimes been referred as liberal parties, though their liberal nature has not been confirmed.

Ukrainian Radical Democratic Party
1905: Inspired by the ideas of Michailo Drahomanov, sympathizers of the Russian Constitutional Democratic Party in Ukraine formed the liberal Ukrainian Radical Democratic Party (Ukrajin'ska Radikal'no-Demokratyčna Partija).
1908: The party is reorganized into the Ukrainian Progressive League (Tovarystvo Ukraijins'kych Progresystov), which became the dominant party.
1917: The party is renamed "Ukrainian Party of Federalist Socialists" (Ukrajin'ska Partija Federalistiv-Socialistiv), which was, despite its name, a liberal democratic party led by Serhij Jefremov. He did not survive the anti-Ukrainian processes by the communist regime. In exile, the party was renamed into its original name, the Ukrainian Radical Democratic Party.

Liberal leaders
Serhij Jefremov
Juriy Hudymenko
Volodymyr Zelenskyy

See also
History of Ukraine
Politics of Ukraine
List of political parties in Ukraine

References 

 
Ukraine
Liberal parties timeline